Harry Yoon, ACE, is a Korean-American film editor. He is best known for his work on Minari, Euphoria, Detroit and The Best of Enemies.

Life and career
Harry was born in South Korea, and immigrated to the U.S. with his parents when he was five years old. He attended school in San Leandro, California and graduated From San Leandro High School in 1989. He graduated from  Williams College and attended the Graduate Directing Program at New York University. He began his career as an editor for short films and documentaries. He has worked with some of the most renowned editors, including William Goldenberg, Stephen Mirrione and Tom Cross. His VFX editor credits include The Revenant, Zero Dark Thirty , The Hunger Games and Shang-Chi and the Legend of the Ten Rings

Filmography

Awards and nominations

References

External links
 

Living people
South Korean emigrants to the United States
American film editors
Williams College alumni
American Cinema Editors
Year of birth missing (living people)